John T. Williams may refer to:

 John T. Williams (politician) (1864–1944), member of the Wisconsin State Assembly
 John T. Williams (woodcarver) (1960–2010), Native American woodcarver shot by police
 John Thomas Williams (1929–2018), American jazz pianist
 John Towner Williams (born 1932), American composer and conductor
 John Tucker Williams (1789–1854), Canadian politician
 John Tudno Williams (born 1938), moderator of the Presbyterian Church of Wales and principal of United Theological College, Aberystwyth

See also
 John Williams (disambiguation)